Ross Stevenson may refer to:

Ross Stevenson (radio presenter) (born 1957), Australian radio presenter
K. Ross Stevenson (born 1942), Canadian politician